Metairie is a census-designated place (CDP) in Jefferson Parish, Louisiana, United States, and is part of the New Orleans metropolitan area. With a population of 143,507 in 2020, Metairie is the largest community in Jefferson Parish and was (as of 2010) the fifth-largest CDP in the United States. It is an unincorporated area that (as of 2020) would have been Louisiana's fourth-largest city behind Shreveport if incorporated.

Etymology 
Métairie is the French term for a small tenant farm which paid the landlord with a share of the produce, a practice also known as sharecropping (in French, métayage). In the 1760s many of the original French farmers were tenants; after the Civil War, the majority of the community's inhabitants were sharecroppers until urbanization started in the 1910s.

History 
In the 1720s French settlers became the first Europeans to settle Metairie in the area known then as Tchoupitoulas and now as Metairie Ridge, a natural levee formed by an ancient branch of the Mississippi River, Bayou Metairie, which flowed through modern-day River Ridge, Metairie, Gentilly, and New Orleans East. It emptied into Mississippi Sound. The Acolapissa Native Americans used this ridge as a road; it is the oldest road in the New Orleans area. Paved in the 1920s, it is called Metairie Road. An electric streetcar was installed running along Metairie Road in the late 1910s, opening the area to greater development. Upscale housing tracts were constructed off the road in the 1920s; this area is now known as "Old Metairie". The areas to the north and northwest of Metairie Road were not developed until after World War II. The land between Metairie Ridge and Lake Pontchartrain, which was cypress swamps and marshlands, was drained with the Wood Pump. With development of this new land for residences, Metairie's population grew in the 1940s as a result of cheaper land, lower taxes, and larger lots as compared to Orleans Parish.

Much of the community was under  of water.

Hurricane Betsy, a Category Three storm, hit the area in 1965, causing extensive wind damage and moderate flooding.

In 1989, a Metairie district elected white supremacist David Duke to the Louisiana state legislature for a single term. 

On August 29, 2005, Hurricane Katrina caused a new migration from Orleans Parish, because housing was needed to replace what had been destroyed in the flooding of the city. It has been a racially neutral migration, with equal numbers of black and white residents moving to Jefferson Parish. The 2010 census showed that Metairie has increasingly become more diverse.

Veterans Boulevard was laid out alongside a drainage canal, and became a commercial center of the region. The central business district of Metairie is located on Causeway Boulevard near Lake Pontchartrain. Metairie also has one of the handful of major malls located in the New Orleans metro area. Lakeside Shopping Center is the highest-grossing mall in the New Orleans metropolitan area. In the 1970s and early 1980s, an area of bars and nightclubs opened in a section of Metairie known as "Fat City", which is now the most racially diverse area in the New Orleans metropolitan area and is home to a vibrant restaurant scene. Several New Orleans radio and television stations have transmitter facilities in Metairie and Jefferson Parish; two of them, WGNO-TV and WNOL, now have studios and main offices in Metairie. Metairie has a large Mardi Gras season that touts itself as more family-friendly than the New Orleans Mardi Gras.

Geography
Metairie is located in eastern Jefferson Parish and is bordered by New Orleans to the east, Kenner to the west, Lake Pontchartrain to the north, and the Illinois Central Railroad tracks to the south. South of the railroad are River Ridge, Harahan, Elmwood, and Jefferson. The 17th Street Canal forms the border between Metairie and New Orleans to the east. It is a principal community in Greater New Orleans.

Climate
The climate of Metairie has been classified as humid subtropical. Like the city of New Orleans, it has short, generally mild winters and hot, humid summers. The average precipitation is  annually; the summer months are the wettest, while October is the driest month. Precipitation in winter usually accompanies the passing of a cold front. It is rare for the temperature to reach , with the last occurrence of each being February 5, 1996, and June 26, 2016, respectively.

Tallest buildings

Demographics

According to the 2019 American Community Survey, there were 130,427 people living in the census-designated place. At the 2010 United States census, there were 138,481 people living in Metairie. The 2020 census reported 143,507 people living in the CDP. As of 2019, population density was 5,607.7 people per square mile, with a median age of 40.6.

At the 2019 American Community Survey, the racial and ethnic makeup was 69% non-Hispanic white, 10% Black and African American, 4% Asian, 1% multiracial, and 16% Hispanic and Latino American. According to 2017 census estimates, the racial makeup of Metairie was 67.5% White, 16.2% Hispanic or Latino American of any race, 9.9% Black and African American, 3.9% Asian, 0.7% from other races, 0.9% from two or more races, and 0.1% Native American. By the time of the 2020 census, its racial and ethnic makeup was 62.89% non-Hispanic white, 10.98% Black or African American, 0.49% Native American, 3.73% Asian, 0.02% Pacific Islander, 18.20% two or more races, and 18.42% Hispanic or Latino American of any race.

Among the population of Metairie, 52% were female in 2019. There were 56,421 households with an average of 2.63 persons per household. An estimated 52% of households were married couples living together, 23% non-family, 18% female householder with no male present, and 7% male householder with no female present. Approximately 61,354 housing units were in the community, and 92% were occupied; 59% of housing units were owner-occupied, and 64% of housing units were single unit structures. The median value of owner-occupied housing units was $246,600, and the median household income was $60,404. Residents had a per capita income of $35,007 at the 2019 American Community Survey.

Religion
In Metairie, 54.1% of residents identified with some religion as of 2019. Due to Spanish and French colonial influence, Metairie and the surrounding area have an overwhelmingly Catholic populace. Approximately 34.6% identify with the Catholic Church, served by the Roman Catholic Archdiocese of New Orleans; 5.9% were Baptist, 3.1% Pentecostal, 1.4% Methodist, 0.6% Lutheran, 0.6% Latter-Day Saints, 0.5% Anglican, and 0.5% from another Christian group including the Metropolitan Community Church among others.

Approximately 0.7% were Muslims and 0.4% identified with an Eastern religion such as Hinduism, Buddhism, or Sikhism; 0.6% of the community claimed affiliation with Judaism. Metairie is home to Congregation Gates of Prayer, a Reform synagogue, and beside it is Congregation Beth Israel, the oldest Orthodox congregation in the New Orleans metro area. Beth Israel constructed its new building in Metairie in 2012, several years after its building in Lakeview, New Orleans was destroyed by Hurricane Katrina.

Arts and culture

Public libraries

Jefferson Parish Library operates public libraries. The East Bank Regional Library, which houses the library system's headquarters, is in Metairie. Other public libraries in Metairie include the Lakeshore Library, the Old Metairie Library, and the Wagner Library.

Sports

Metairie was home to the New Orleans Baby Cakes Triple-A Minor League Baseball team of the Pacific Coast League from 1993 to 2019. The minor league club played its home games at Privateer Park, home to the University of New Orleans's NCAA baseball team, from 1992 through 1996, and at Shrine on Airline from 1997 to 2019.

The training facilities of NFL franchise New Orleans Saints and the NBA franchise New Orleans Pelicans are located in Metairie. As such, many players reside in the area.

Boxing cards have been held in the Copeland Tower Suites (formerly Landmark Hotel).

Beginning in 2020, the New Orleans Gold of Major League Rugby will play their homes games in Metairie at the Gold Mine on Airline.

Parks and recreation

Jefferson Parish has created many parks in Metairie. Many of these playgrounds have organized sports leagues such as football, baseball, and basketball. Some of them also have other programs, such as low-cost piano lessons. The parks in Metairie are:  
  Cleary Playground
  Delta Playground
  Doe Playground
  Girard Playground
  Jim O'Ryan Playground
  Johnny Bright Playground
  Lafreniere Park
  Lakeshore Playground
  LaSalle Park
  Mike Miley Playground
  Pontiff Playground

Education
Metairie's public schools are operated by the Jefferson Parish Public School System.There are two zoned public high schools in Metairie:
 East Jefferson High School
 Grace King High School

Additionally, some residents are zoned to Alfred Bonnabel High School in Kenner, and some are zoned to Riverdale High School in Jefferson.

Magnet public school
 Haynes Academy for Advanced Studies

Private schools
 Archbishop Chapelle High School
 Archbishop Rummel High School
 Crescent City Christian School
 Ecole Classique
 Lutheran High School
 Metairie Park Country Day School
 Ridgewood Preparatory School
 St. Martin's Episcopal School

Infrastructure

Transportation 

The most common method of transportation within Metairie is the automobile. Mass transit is provided by "JeT" (Jefferson Transit), but it does not run on Sundays, holidays, or late at night, unlike many lines of New Orleans' RTA. JeT's coverage is also very limited in terms of usability.

Interstate 10 runs east–west through Metairie.

Major east–west roads (starting from north to south) include West Esplanade Avenue, Veterans Memorial Boulevard, West Napoleon Avenue, West Metairie Avenue, Metairie Road, Airline Drive (which is part of U.S. Route 61) and Jefferson Highway (which is part of U.S. Route 90). The Earhart Expressway, running east–west immediately south of Airline Drive, is the only other freeway entering New Orleans from the west, but it ends as an expressway soon after crossing into Orleans Parish  and well before the New Orleans CBD (in Central City.)

For many of the major east–west roadways, the eastbound and westbound lanes are separated by large, open-topped drainage canals. These canals are one of the most distinct characteristics of the Metairie landscape.  Similar canals once bisected many streets in neighboring New Orleans, but most were covered over in the mid-20th century.

Multi-line, continuous north–south roads (starting from west to east) include Power Boulevard/David Drive/Hickory Avenue, Transcontinental Drive, Clearview Parkway, Causeway Boulevard, and Bonnabel Boulevard.

The Lake Pontchartrain Causeway's southern terminus lies in Metairie.

See also
Metairie Cemetery

References

External links

 Metairie community website

Census-designated places in Louisiana
Census-designated places in Jefferson Parish, Louisiana
Census-designated places in New Orleans metropolitan area